Tyvriv is an urban-type settlement in Vinnytsia Oblast, Ukraine. Geographically it is in eastern Podolia on the shore of Southern Bug, southeast of Vinnytsia. It was formerly the administrative center of the Tyvriv Raion, and is now administered within Vinnytsia Raion. Population:

History

Tywrów was granted Magdeburg rights in 1744. Until the Partitions of Poland it was part of the Bracław Voivodeship of the Lesser Poland Province of the Polish Crown. It was a small town, owned by Polish nobility. In the 18th century the two landmarks of the town were built: Michał Jan Klityński founded the Baroque St. Michael's church, and Zachariasz Jaroszyński built a palace complex.

In 1900, there were around 1,000 Jews living there. The city was under German, then Romanian occupation from 1941 to 1944. In 1941 in Tyvriv was created one of the greatest ghetto's in region. 

The most of Jews were killed during two different actions in a forest close to the city, in 1941, when it was still under German occupation. There was several hundred victims.

References

Urban-type settlements in Vinnytsia Raion
Vinnitsky Uyezd
Holocaust locations in Ukraine